Pocky & Rocky with Becky, known in Japan as , is a shoot 'em up video game developed by Altron for the Game Boy Advance (GBA). Distributed by Taito, the game was published by Altron in Japan, and localized by Natsume in North America. It is the fourth game in the Pocky & Rocky series.

Gameplay

The gameplay is similar to that of the Pocky & Rocky series. Players select a character to play from — Pocky, Rocky, or Becky.

Plot
Long ago, a demon took over and a shrine maiden sealed the demon. Later, the demon breaks out and the gang - Pocky, Rocky, and Becky - has to defeat the demon before it is too late.

Reception

References

External links
Natsume page

2001 video games
Shoot_'em_ups
Pocky & Rocky
Virtual Console games
Game Boy Advance games
Natsume (company) games
Altron games
Virtual Console games for Wii U
Video games featuring female protagonists
Video games about demons
Video games about raccoons
Video games set in feudal Japan
Video games developed in Japan
Single-player video games